Marjolaine Hecquet (born 25 March 1993) is a French female canoeist who won five medals at individual senior level at the Wildwater Canoeing World Championships and European Wildwater Championships.

Biography
Hecquet practiced the canoe sprint up to the under-23 level and then moved definitively to the wildwater canoeing where she obtained the best results, including three world champion titles.

References

External links
 Marjolaine Hecquet at Canoeresults.net

1993 births
Living people
French female canoeists